is a 2015 Japanese drama film directed by Yukihiko Tsutsumi and based on a novel of the same name by Arata Tendo. It was released on February 14, 2015.

Cast
 Kengo Kora as Shizuto Sakatsuki
 Yuriko Ishida as Yukiyo Nagi
 Arata Iura as Sakuya Kōsui
 Yusuke Yamamoto
 Yumi Asō
 Suzuka Ohgo
 Keiko Toda
 Mitsuru Hirata as Takahiko Sakatsuki
 Kippei Shiina as Kōtarō Makino
 Shinobu Otake as Junko Sakatsuki

Production
Filming started on March 22, 2014.

Reception
The film has grossed  at the Japanese box office.

References

2015 films
Films directed by Yukihiko Tsutsumi
Films based on Japanese novels
Films set in a fictional country
Japanese drama films
2015 drama films
2010s Japanese films